Charles “Charlie” Oliver (born 9 July 1955) is a retired middle-distance athlete from the Solomon Islands.

Oliver was part of the Solomon Island team that was first to compete at the Olympics when they went to the 1984 Summer Olympics which was held in Los Angeles. He entered the 800 metres, he managed to finish sixth in his heat but it still wasn't good enough to advance to the next round.

Achievements

References

External links
 
 South Pacific Mini Games

1955 births
Living people
Solomon Islands male middle-distance runners
Athletes (track and field) at the 1982 Commonwealth Games
Commonwealth Games competitors for the Solomon Islands
Athletes (track and field) at the 1984 Summer Olympics
Olympic athletes of the Solomon Islands